The Order of the Brilliant Star of Zanzibar (Wisam al-Kawkab al-Durri al-Zanzibari) is a decoration awarded by the Sultan of Zanzibar for meritorious services and since The Order of Independence was created in 1963 it is reserved for the persons rendering extraordinary service to the Sultan, his heirs and successors and other members of the Royal family. It was state order from its inception in 1865 to the overthrow of the Sultanate on 12 January 1964 and currently is a House Order of the Zanzibari Royal Family. Current Grand Master is Sayyid Jamshid bin Abdullah Al Said, Titular Sultan of Zanzibar. Initially the decoration had two grades, the first of which was usually awarded to foreign heads of state and the second which was further subdivided into five hierarchical classes.  Currently the second grade only is being awarded.

History 

The Order was instituted by Sultan Sayyid Majid bin Said Al-Busaid in 1865, amended by  Sultan Barghash bin Said on 22 December 1875, and amended again by Sultan Sayyid Sir Khalifa II bin Harub Al-Said on 5 August 1918 when it became an award in five classes for meritorious service (1. First Class – limited to 40 recipients, 2. Second Class – 60 recipients, 3. Third Class – 80 recipients, 4. Fourth Class – 90 recipients, and 5. Fifth Class – 100 recipients).

Design 

Both classes awarded neck medals in medallion form to be worn around the neck on formal occasions and breast badges, smaller awards which could be worn on the left breast like conventional medals.  The neck medal was made of silver gilt, enamel and gold with a five pointed star surrounded by a wreath.  The centre of the medal featured a portrait of the awarding Sultan for the first grade medals and the Sultan's monogram in gold on a red background for the second grade.  The breast order was an eight pointed star in silver, again featuring the Sultan's portrait for the first grade and a monogram for the second.  The ribbon for all medals was red with white edges.

Classes and insignia

I grade
 Grand Cross

II grade
 Grand Cross (limited to 40 members)
 Grand Officer (limited to 60 members)
 Commander (limited to 80 members)
 Officer (limited to 90 members)
 Member (limited to 100 members)

Notable recipients 

Prince Shah Karim Al Hussaini, Aga Khan IV
 Otto von Bismarck (I grade with diamonds)
 Paul von Buri
 Henry Edward Colvile
 Clement Lloyd Hill
 Princess Margaret, Countess of Snowdon
 Lloyd Mathews
 Isma'il Pasha
 Cecil Pereira
 Prince Philip, Duke of Edinburgh
 Arthur Raikes
 Harry Rawson
 John Houston Sinclair
 Michael Tighe (Indian Army officer)
 Hermann Wissmann (II grade, Grand Cross)

Gallery

References 

.

External links 

 The Official Website of the Zanzibari Royal Family http://www.zanzibarroyalfamily.org

Orders, decorations, and medals of the Sultanate of Zanzibar
Awards established in 1875